Shanker is a surname. Notable people with the surname include:

 Albert Shanker (1928–1997), president of the American Federation of Teachers
 Ram Shanker (born 1985), Singaporean footballer
 Sasi Shanker (1957–2016), Indian film director

See also
Shankar (disambiguation)